Stanley Alexander Petrie (15 September 1906 – 22 February 1979) was an  Australian rules footballer who played with Hawthorn in the Victorian Football League (VFL).

Football
Recruited from Carnegie in the Sub Districts FL where he kicked 50 goals in 1927 he played three games for the Mayblooms.

He played for Camberwell from 1930 to 1932, Traralgon in 1933 and was back at Camberwell for 1934. After a Port Melbourne match he quit siting dismay at the club and was cleared to Prahran.

In 1936 he was appointed captain-coach of the Darling Football Club in the Federal FL.

Notes

References

External links 
 
 
 Stan Petrie, at The VFA Project.

1906 births
1979 deaths
Australian rules footballers from Melbourne
Australian Rules footballers: place kick exponents
Hawthorn Football Club players
Camberwell Football Club players
People from South Melbourne